Kapovich is a Jewish surname. Notable people with the surname include:

Ilya Kapovich, Russian-American mathematician
Katia Kapovich (born 1960), Russian-American poet
Michael Kapovich (born 1963), Russian-American mathematician

Jewish surnames
Russian-language surnames